Maritime Broadcasting System Limited, branded as MBS Radio, is a private Canadian broadcasting company owning 21 radio stations serving several communities in Nova Scotia, Prince Edward Island, and New Brunswick.

MBS Radio was established in 1969 as Eastern Broadcasting Limited in Campbellton, New Brunswick and is currently owned by Rob Pace.  The company's head office is now located in Halifax, Nova Scotia on Lovett Lake Court in the Bayers Lake area. Prior to moving to its new location at Lovett Lake Court, they were located on Sackville Street in Downtown Halifax.

Stations

Nova Scotia
 Amherst: CKDH-FM
 Halifax: CHFX-FM, CHNS-FM
 Kentville: CKEN-FM, CKWM-FM
 Sydney: CHER-FM, CJCB, CKPE-FM
 Windsor: CFAB

Prince Edward Island
 Charlottetown: CFCY-FM, CHLQ-FM
 Summerside: CJRW-FM

New Brunswick
 Campbellton: CKNB-FM
 Miramichi: CFAN-FM
 Moncton: CFQM-FM, CHOY-FM, CKCW-FM
 Saint John: CFBC, CIOK-FM, CJYC-FM
 Sussex: CJCW

On October 28, 2011, Maritime Broadcasting System Ltd. applied to the CRTC to operate a new country FM radio station at Miramichi, New Brunswick. If approved, the new station will operate at 102.5 MHz.

Unionized staff at three MBS stations in Saint John, CFBC, CIOK-FM, CJYC-FM, went on strike in June 2012, a strike that lasted close to two years. Employees signed a deal in May 2014 and returned to work.

References

External links
MBS Radio
History of Maritime Broadcasting System Ltd. - Canadian Communications Foundation

Radio broadcasting companies of Canada
Companies based in Halifax, Nova Scotia
Mass media companies established in 1969
1969 establishments in Nova Scotia